Elections to Liverpool Town Council were held on Monday 1 November 1870. One third of the council seats were up for election, the term of office of each councillor being three years.
Nine of the sixteen wards were uncontested.

After the election, the composition of the council was:

Election result

Because of the large number of uncontested seats, these statistics should be taken in that context.

Ward results

* - Retiring Councillor seeking re-election

Abercromby

Castle Street

Everton

Exchange

Great George

Lime Street

North Toxteth

Pitt Street

Rodney Street

St. Anne Street

St. Paul's

St. Peter's

Scotland

South Toxteth

Vauxhall

West Derby

By-elections

No.4, St. Paul's, 17 March 1871

The death of Alderman Richard Sheil was reported to the Council on 1 March 1870.

Councillor Oliver Holden (Conservative, St. Paul's, elected 1 November 1868) was elected as an alderman by the Council (Councillors and Aldermen) on 8 March 1871.

Aldermanic By Election, 15 April 1871

The death of Alderman John Stewart JP was reported to the Council meeting on 19 April 1871.

Peter Thomson was elected as an Alderman by the Council (Councillors and Aldermen) on 15 April 1871.

Aldermanic By Election, 6 October 1871

The death of Alderman Thomas Dover JP was reported to the Council meeting on 4 October 1871.

Former Councillor James Jack (Conservative, Rodney Street last elected 1 November 1864) was elected as an alderman by the Council (Councillors and Aldermen) on 6 October 1871.

See also

 Liverpool City Council
 Liverpool Town Council elections 1835 - 1879
 Liverpool City Council elections 1880–present
 Mayors and Lord Mayors of Liverpool 1207 to present
 History of local government in England

References

1870
1870 English local elections
November 1870 events
1870s in Liverpool